Hajia Alima Mahama (born 17 November 1957, Walewale, North East Region) is Ghana's first female ambassador to the US. She is a lawyer and was from January 2005 to January 2009 Minister for the affairs of women and children in Ghana under President John Kufuor. She was  also the Ghanaian Minister of Local Government and Rural Development, appointed into office by  President of Ghana Nana Akuffo-Addo on 10 January 2017 to 7 January 2021. Hajia Alima also served as the Member of Parliament for  Nalerigu/Gambaga constituency and a member of the New Patriotic Party in the 7th Parliament of the 4th Republic.

She was appointed Ambassador of Ghana to the United States of America in June, 2021.

Education 
Alima Mahama had her senior high school education at the Wesley Girls Senior High School, Cape Coast. She continued her education at the University of Ghana where she earned a bachelor's degree in Law and Sociology. At the Rutgers University and the University of Ottawa, she had her postgraduate degree in Public Policy and Development Planning and Administration. She has also earned a master's degree in Development Studies from the Institute of Social Studies, in the Netherlands. Hajia Mahama is a product of the Ghana School of Law and was called to the bar in 1982.

Politics 
She served in the government of John Agyekum Kufuor, firstly as the Minister for Women and Children Affairs, Deputy Minister for Trade and Industry and Deputy Minister for Local Government and Rural Development between 2001 and 2008. Alima Mahama contested in the 2016 election on the ticket of the New Patriotic Party (NPP) and won with over 53% of the votes in  Nalerigu/Gambaga constituency.

Other activities 
 Clean Cooking Alliance, Member of the Leadership Council

References

1957 births
Living people
Ghanaian Muslims
Government ministers of Ghana
Ghanaian women lawyers
Women members of the Parliament of Ghana
Women government ministers of Ghana
New Patriotic Party politicians
Ghanaian MPs 2013–2017
Ghanaian MPs 2017–2021
20th-century Ghanaian lawyers
Ambassadors of Ghana to the United States
21st-century Ghanaian women politicians